Lemniscaat or Lemniscaat Publishers is a Dutch independent publishing house based in Rotterdam, Netherlands. The company publishes both children's literature and non-fiction books for adults. The company is named after the lemniscate symbol.

History 

Lemniscaat was founded in 1963 by Jean Louis and Marijke Boele van Hensbroek. 

Many Dutch children's authors have had their work published by Lemniscaat, including Jan Terlouw, Thea Beckman, Ingrid Schubert, Dieter Schubert, Lieneke Dijkzeul and Anke Kranendonk. The company has also worked with many illustrators, including Jan Jutte, Alice Hoogstad, Charlotte Dematons and Marije Tolman.

In 2007, the company started to republish Paul Biegel's work but with new illustrations that the company paid for. As a result, Lemniscaat had to pay a lower amount of royalties to Leonie Biegel, Biegel's daughter. In 2012, Lemniscaat filed a preliminary injunction against Biegel's daughter who intended to move her father's work to another publishing house.

References

External links 
 English website
 Dutch website

Publishing companies of the Netherlands
Publishing companies established in 1963
Companies based in Rotterdam
Dutch companies established in 1963